Prahlada is a 1941 Indian Malayalam-language film,  directed by K. Subramaniam and produced by Madras United Artist Corporation. The film stars T. K. Balachandran, N. P. Chellappan Nair,  Guru Gopinath, Thankamani Gopinath and Kumari Lakshmi. The film's score was composed by Vidwan V. S. Parthasarathy Ayyankar. The movie is the remake of Prahalada, a Tamil film released in 1939. It is the first mythological film in Malayalam. It is the debut Malayalam film of director-producer K. Subramaniam, T. K. Balachandran and music director V. S. Parthasarathy Iyengar. It was also the debut film of Guru Gopinath and Thankamani Gopinath.

Cast
 T. K. Balachandran
 N. P. Chellappan Nair as Sukracharya)
 Guru Gopinath (as Hiranyakasipu)
 Thankamani Gopinath (as Kayathu)
 Satyajeet singh
 Kumari Lakshmi (as Prahlada)

References

External links
 

1941 films
1940s Malayalam-language films
Films about Prahlada
Indian black-and-white films
Films directed by K. Subramanyam
Films based on the Bhagavata Purana
Films scored by Vidwan V. S. Parthasarathy Ayyankar